National Judges College is an educational institute in Beijing under the Supreme People's Court.  It is responsible for training the judges of the People's Republic of China.  It was established in 1997 and has 12 branches in the high people's courts in Beijing, Shanghai, Tianjin, Inner Mongolia, Sichuan, Shandong, Heilongjiang, Henan, Gansu, Guangdong, Guangxi, and Jiangsu.

References

http://www.judges.org
http://www.ipkey.org/en/activities/past-activities/item/3413-inter-ministerial-visit-to-the-european-union-on-ip-related-policies-legal-framework-and-enforcement-practices

External links
 Official website of the National Judges College

Universities and colleges in Beijing
Educational institutions established in 1997
1997 establishments in China